Lifeforms is the second studio album by British electronica group The Future Sound of London. The album was released on 23 May 1994 by Virgin Records and later by Astralwerks.

Background
The Future Sound of London began work on the album around the same time as they were finishing Tales of Ephidrina, and the more complex, ambient direction they were taking resulted in Lifeforms. The artwork also progressed from previous works, with soon-to-be familiar images of the "Witch Girl" Sheuneen Ta and the "Spike" computer model having been previously used on the group's Cascade EP.

Reception

Lifeforms achieved commercial success and produced hit singles such as "Cascade" and "Lifeforms". The album was certified silver by the British Phonographic Industry (BPI) for over 60,000 units sold.

AllMusic called it "one of the best experimental techno releases of the '90s" and "an inventive, fascinating aural experience, as rich and detailed as the Orb's best work."

The Swedish band Carbon Based Lifeforms got the idea of its name partly from this album.

Track listing

Personnel
 The Future Sound of London – production, writing
Additional musicians
 Robert Fripp – guitar textures and bytes on "Flak"
 Toni Halliday – vocal texture on "Cerebral"
 Ozric Tentacles – sound bytes on "Flak"
 Talvin Singh – Tabla Tronics on "Life Form Ends"
 Yage – engineering
Additional personnel
 The Future Sound of London – art direction
 Buggy G. Riphead – art direction
 Peter Atkinson – photography
 Stephen Marks – photography
 P. Knott – photography
 Alistair Shay – photography
 Martin Poole – photography
 Olaf Wendt – CGI design
 Rob Manley – A&R

Charts

References

External links
 
 

1994 albums
Astralwerks albums
The Future Sound of London albums
Virgin Records albums